Mikrokleisoura may refer to:
 Mikrokleisoura, Drama, a village in Greece
 Mikrokleisoura, Grevena, a village in Greece